Ivana Arsenievska (born 8 December 2003) is a Macedonian female handballer for ŽRK Metalurg and the North Macedonia national team.

She represented the North Macedonia at the 2022 European Women's Handball Championship.

References

External links

2003 births
Living people
Macedonian female handball players